is a Japanese reporter who is represented by Kozo Creators with his wife.

He graduated from Seinan Gakuin University with a Bachelor of Commerce degree.

Filmography

TV series

Past

Radio series

References

External links
Kozo Creators 
 

1956 births
Living people
People from Fukuoka Prefecture
Seinan Gakuin University alumni